The 2015 AFC Champions League Final was the final of the 2015 AFC Champions League, the 34th edition of the top-level Asian club football tournament organized by the Asian Football Confederation (AFC), and the 13th under the current AFC Champions League title.

The final was contested in two-legged home-and-away format between Emiratis team Al-Ahli and Chinese team Guangzhou Evergrande. The first leg hosted by Al-Ahli at Al-Rashid Stadium in Dubai on 7 November 2015, while the second leg hosted by Guangzhou Evergrande at the Tianhe Stadium in Guangzhou on 21 November 2015. Having previously won the tournament in 2013 Guangzhou Evergrande has making its second final appearance in three years.

Guangzhou Evergrande won the final 1–0 on aggregate and earned the right to represent the AFC at the 2015 FIFA Club World Cup, entering at the quarterfinal stage.

Qualified teams

Venues

The 2015 AFC Champions League Final was contested in two-legged home-and-away format, held at the home of both finalists. It was the third consecutive year that the AFC adopted such an arrangement.

Al-Ahli's home venue, Al-Rashid Stadium, is a 9,415 seated stadium located in the city of Dubai.

Two previous final has been held in United Arab Emirates. The first one was in the first leg of the 2002–03 final, Al Ain defeated BEC Tero Sasana F.C. 2–0 in Tahnoun bin Mohammed Stadium in the city of Al Ain, and they eventually claimed the title 2–1 on aggregate. The second one was 10 years ago, in the first leg of the 2005 final, Al Ain was defeated by Saudis' team, Al-Ittihad, and they eventually lost the title 3–5 on aggregate.

Guangzhou Evergrande's home venue, Tianhe Stadium, is a 58,500 seated stadium located in the city of Guangzhou.

In the history of the competition, two finals have been held in China and this final will be the third, and the second that Guangzhou hosted. The first final hosted by a Chinese city in 1989–90, which was won by Chinese side Liaoning FC 3–2 against Nissan Yokohama in the city of Shenyang. The next final, the 2013 and second leg of the 2013, was hosted in Guangzhou. The 2013 final was won by Guangzhou Evergrande on the away goals rule with 3–3 on aggregate.

Road to the final

Note: In all results below, the score of the finalist is given first (H: home; A: away).

Rules
The final was played on a home-and-away two-legged basis, with the order of legs decided by draw. The away goals rule, extra time (away goals do not apply in extra time) and penalty shoot-out were used to decide the winner if necessary.

Match details

First leg

Summary

Details

Statistics

Second leg

Summary

Details

Statistics

References

External links
AFC Champions League, the-AFC.com

Final
2015
Guangzhou F.C. matches
Al Ahli Club (Dubai) matches
International club association football competitions hosted by the United Arab Emirates
International club association football competitions hosted by China